The Inambari gnatcatcher (Polioptila attenboroughi) is a species of bird in the family Polioptilidae. It is endemic to Brazil.

Taxonomy and systematics

The Inambari gnatcatcher was described as a new species in 2013. The South American Classification Committee of the American Ornithological Society (SACC/AOS), the International Ornithological Committee (IOC), and the Clements taxonomy accepted it as a distinct species beginning in mid-2019.  It had earlier been treated as a subspecies of the Guianan gnatcatcher (Polioptila guianensis), and BirdLife International (BLI) retains it there as of December 2020.

The Inambari gnatcatcher is monotypic.

Description

Its head, nape, and neck are a uniform plumbeous gray. The throat, breast, upper belly, and flanks are also plumbeous gray, palest near the bill. The lower belly is white. It has a broken white eye ring. The innermost feathers of its tail are black and the outermost approximately 80% white, with those between intergrading.

Distribution and habitat

The Inambari gnatcatcher's full range is not known. All of the few records are from the Brazilian central Amazon Basin south of the Rio Solimões (the Upper Amazon) and west of the Rio Madeira. The region is called the Inambari area of endemism. Inambari Gnatcatcher (Polioptila attenboroughi), version 1.0. In Birds of the World (S. M. Billerman, B. K. Keeney, P. G. Rodewald, and T. S. Schulenberg, Editors). Cornell Lab of Ornithology, Ithaca, NY, USA. https://doi.org/10.2173/bow.inagna1.01 retrieved May 29, 2021

Behavior

Feeding

The details of the Inambari gnatcatcher's diet is unknown but it is probably small invertebrates like that of other Polioptila gnatcatchers. It forages alone or in pairs and seems to always associate with mixed-species foraging flocks. It mostly gleans prey from foliage but also sallies out to catch flying insects.

Breeding

"The nest, eggs, and breeding biology of Inambari Gnatcatcher are completely unknown."

Vocalization

The Inambari gnatcatcher's loudsong is "an evenly paced series of six notes at a nearly level frequency" . It also has a more complex song.

Status

The IUCN has not assessed the Inambari gnatcatcher. "The recent advancement of soybean plantations and general infrastructure along the BR-319 highway linking Manaus to Porto Velho in Brazil, which bisects the known range of Inambari Gnatcatcher, is a clear threat to this species."

See also

 List of things named after David Attenborough and his works

References 

Inambari gnatcatcher
Birds of the Brazilian Amazon
Endemic birds of Brazil
Inambari gnatcatcher
Inambari gnatcatcher